Pont-de-l'Isère (literally Bridge of the Isère) is a French commune, located in the department of Drôme and the Auvergne-Rhône-Alpes region. This town really emerged in 1866 when it was separated from La Roche-de-Glun. Its name comes from the bridge which crosses the Isère to the south of the town, built in 1822 after the old wooden bridge burned down in 1814.

Geography
Pont-de-l'Isère is best known for the fact that it is located on the 45th parallel north. The municipality is located 9 km south of Tain-l'Hermitage (chief town of canton) and 9 km north of Valence. Municipalities that are the closest are La Roche-de-Glun and Beaumont-Monteux.

Population

Twin towns
Pont-de-l'Isère is twinned with:

  Ziano Piacentino, Italy

See also
Communes of the Drôme department

References

Communes of Drôme